Felenne is a village in Wallonia and a district of the municipality of Beauraing, located in the province of Namur, Belgium.

The settlement has existed since the 11th century. Between 1678 and 1699 it was part of France. The nave of the village church is from the 18th century, while the rest of the church dates from 1840. The oldest parts of the mill of the village dates from the 18th century.

References

External links

Populated places in Namur (province)